Web is a 2013 documentary film directed by Michael Kleiman.

The documentary follows several Peruvian families as they gain computer and Internet access for the first time through the One Laptop per Child program. It also includes interviews with people such as author Clay Shirky, Wikipedia's Jimmy Wales, Dennis Crowley of Foursquare, Scott Heiferman of Meetup, and One Laptop founder Nicholas Negroponte. Kleiman spent ten months living in Peru, dividing his time in the towns of Antuyo in the mountains and Palestina in the Amazon rainforest.

Web premiered and won the Sundance Now Audience Award at the 2013 DOC NYC Film Festival.

References

2013 films
Documentary films about the Internet
2013 documentary films
One Laptop per Child
American documentary films
Films shot in Peru
Internet in South America
Articles containing video clips
2010s English-language films
2010s American films